Straight Outta Hell's Kitchen is a 1991 album by Lisa Lisa and Cult Jam. It is best known for the lead track "Let the Beat Hit 'Em" which reached #1 on the Billboard R&B and Dance charts. The only other single released from the album was the ballad "Where Were You When I Needed You". The album's title is named for the Manhattan neighborhood in which lead vocalist Lisa Velez grew up and lived until the mid-2000s. The first half of the album was produced by C+C Music Factory's David Cole and Robert Clivillés, and the second half was produced, as with the previous Lisa Lisa and Cult Jam albums, by Full Force.

Track listing

Personnel
Adapted from AllMusic

Karen Bernod - background vocals
Robert Clivillés - arranger, composer, drums, editing, keyboard arrangements, mixing, percussion, photo imaging, producer, vocal arrangement
David Cole - arranger, composer, keyboard arrangements, keyboards, mixing, producer, vocal arrangement, background vocals
Carol Cooper - executive producer
Deborah Cooper - background vocals
Ricky Crespo - editing
Jim De Barros - design
Pete Diorio - engineer, mixing
Ex Girlfriend - background vocals
Alan Friedman - composer, programming
Full Force - arranger, composer, executive producer, mixing, vocal arrangement, background vocals
Michael Hughes - arranger, percussion, producer, rap
Ernie Isley - composer
O'Kelly Isley - composer
Ronald Isley - composer
Rudolph Isley - composer
Carl James - bass
Chris Jasper - composer
Bashiri Johnson - percussion
Acar S. Key - engineer
Lisa Lisa - executive producer, photo imaging, primary artist, vocals, background vocals
Lisa Lisa and Cult Jam - executive producer, performer, primary artist
Chuck Loeb - guitar
Fred McFarlane - keyboards
Veronica McHugh - production coordination
Cindy Mizelle - background vocals
Alexander "Spanador" Mosley - arranger, guitar, keyboards, producer
Ken Nahoum - photography, photo imaging
Duran Ramos - composer, keyboard arrangements, vocal arrangement
Cheryl Pepsii Riley - background vocals
Bob Rosa - editing, mixing
Steve Salem - executive producer
Lisa Velez - group member
Barbara Warren-Pace - producer, production coordination
Audrey Wheeler - background vocals
Tim White - photography
Larry Yasgar - executive producer

Charts

References

Lisa Lisa and Cult Jam albums
1991 albums
Columbia Records albums
Albums produced by Full Force
Albums produced by David Cole (record producer)